Kuna Caves are lava tubes found south of Kuna, Idaho. There is currently one publicly known entrance to the cave, an opening in the ground with a caged ladder leading down into the cave.

Background 

Though according to locals, at one time the system had been much larger and was composed of multiple caves, even stretching to the Snake River, before the United States Army Corps of Engineers blocked it off by detonating dynamite collapsing a portion of the cave. A logbook was placed deep in the North end of the cave for people to sign in 2018. Although the entrance has a ladder to get down into the cavern, it is not maintained. The short road leading to the cave is unmaintained, often very muddy, and the cave itself is littered with trash and graffiti. The interior temperature of the cave hovers around  year round.

The official Bureau of Land Management stance on the cave is that it should not be visited by the general public.

References

Landforms of Ada County, Idaho
Lava tubes
Caves of Idaho
Wild caves